The 1979 Individual Speedway Junior European Championship was the third edition of the European Under-21 Championships.

European final
July 22, 1979
 Leningrad, Jääspeedway

References

1979
European Individual U-21
Speedway competitions in Russia
1979 in Soviet sport